Oleg Lebedev (born February 4, 1971) is a Russian former professional basketball who last played for Turismo de Merida in Spain.

References

External links
 
 

1971 births
Living people
BC Avtodor Saratov players
BC Dynamo Moscow players
KK MZT Skopje players
Maccabi Rehovot B.C. players
PBC CSKA Moscow players
Russian men's basketball players
Basketball players from Moscow
ZTE KK players
Small forwards
Shooting guards